Cruz Verde Airport  is an airport serving the city of Ibagué, in the Tolima Department of Colombia.

See also

Transport in Colombia
List of airports in Colombia

References

External links
FallingRain - Cruz Verde

Airports in Colombia